Saharat Sangkapreecha, nickname Kong (RTGS: Kong), is a Thai 1980s and 90s pop star, a member of the band Nuvo since 1988, renowned actor, voice-over artist, composer and a coach on the singing contest The Voice Thailand.

Filmography

Dramas 

 Prik Key Noo Kub Moo Ham (TV3, 1994)
 Jan Aey Jun Jao (TV3, 2005)
 Battle of Angels (TV5, 2008)
 Wongkhumlao The Series (TV9, 2010)
 Malai Sarm Chai (TV5, 2010)
 Likit Sanae Ha (TV3, 2011)
 Mae Yai Tee Ruk (TV3, 2012)
 Office Pichit Jai (TV9, 2013)
 Under Her Nose (Workpoint, 2017) as Sun

Movies 
 No Surrender, No Matter What (1994)
 The Legend of Suriyothai (2001) as Bayinnaung
 Ladda Land (2011) as Thee
 Together (2012)
 Suddenly Twenty (2016)

References

External links 
 
 

1968 births
Living people
Saharat Sangkapreecha
Saharat Sangkapreecha
Saharat Sangkapreecha
Saharat Sangkapreecha
Saharat Sangkapreecha
Saharat Sangkapreecha
Thai television personalities
Saharat Sangkapreecha